Plaça d'Espanya is one of Barcelona's most important squares, built on the occasion of the 1929 Barcelona International Exposition, held at the foot of Montjuïc, in the Sants-Montjuïc district.

Features
One of the city's biggest squares, it is the junction of several major thoroughfares: Gran Via de les Corts Catalanes, Avinguda del Paral·lel, Carrer de la Creu Coberta and Carrer de Tarragona, and leads to the Palau Nacional through Avinguda de la Reina Maria Cristina, which houses one of Catalonia's finest museums, the Museu Nacional d'Art de Catalunya (MNAC). It was designed by Josep Amargós. The fountain at the centre of the square was designed by Josep Maria Jujol, a collaborator of Antoni Gaudí, while Miquel Blay designed the statues. The buildings were designed by Nicolau Maria Rubió i Tudurí.
Venetian Towers - they are 47 m (154 ft) tall and lead the way to the MNAC via Avinguda de la Reina Maria Cristina, an avenue commonly used to host trade fairs.
Fira de Barcelona
Parc de Joan Miró - previously known as Parc de l'Escorxador (Abattoir Park), it is nowadays named after the Catalan painter Joan Miró, whose 22-metre-tall statue Dona i Ocell (Woman and Bird) can be seen in one of its corners.
Arenas de Barcelona, a bullring - It was built in 1900 in the Moorish Revival style and has been converted into a shopping center.

History
The square was built on a site that had been previously used for public hangings, until the creation of the now demolished Ciutadella fortress in 1715, where the gallows were moved. It was designed in 1915 and built in 1929 so that it could be ready to host the 1929 Universal Exposition. The square has been in public use since then.

Transport
Plaça d'Espanya is also a major transport hub that serves most parts of the Metropolitan Area of Barcelona.

Metro
Espanya (L1, L3, L8)

Bus
Line 7 Diagonal Mar - Maria Cristina
Line 9 Pl. Catalunya - Pg. Zona Franca
Line 13 Mercat de St. Antoni - Can Clos
Line 23 Pl. Espanya - Parc Logístic
Line 27 Pl. Espanya - Roquetes
Line 30 Pl. Espanya - Sarrià
Line 34 Sarrià - Virrei Amat
Line 36 Paral·lel - -Can Drago
Line 37 Hospital Cínic - Zona Franca
Line 43 Les Corts - Sant Adrià
Line 46 Pl. Espanya - Aeroport
Line 50 Montjuïc - Trinitat Nova
Line 56 Collblanc - Besòs / Verneda
Line 57 Barcelona (Pg. Marítim) - Cornellà (Estació busos)
Line 61 Poble Sec - Parc de Montjuïc
Line 68 Poble Sec - Parc de Montjuïc
Line 79 Pl. Espanya - Av. Carrilet (M)
Line 80 Barcelona (Pl. Espanya) - Gavà (Av. Joan Carles II)
Line 81 Barcelona (Pl. Espanya) - Gavà (Av. Joan Carles II)
Line 91 Rambles - Bordeta
Line 153 Barcelona - Cornellà
Line 157 Pg. Marítm - Sant Joan Despí
Line 193 Pl. Espanya - C. Montjuïc

Night bus
Line N0 Pl. Portal de la Pau - Pl. Portal de la Pau
Line N1 Zona Franca (Mercabarna) - Pl. Catalunya - Roquetes (Aiguablava)
Line N2 Hospitalet (Av. Carrilet) - Badalona (Via Augusta)
Line N14 Barcelona (Rda. Universitat) - Castelldefels (Centre Vila)
Line N15 Barcelona (Pl. Portal de la Pau) - Sant Joan Despí (Rbla. Josep Maria Jujol)
Line N16 Barcelona (Rda. Universitat) - Castelldefels (Bellamar)
Line N17 Pl. Catalunya - Aeroport

Train

Ferrocarrils de la Generalitat de Catalunya

Metro del Baix Llobregat
R5/R50 Manresa-Baixador
R6/R60 Igualada
S3 Can Ros
S4 Olesa de Montserrat
S8 Martorell-Enllaç
S9 Quatre Camins
L8 Molí Nou

See also 

 Urban planning of Barcelona

External links

Barcelona.cat
FiraBcn.es

Plazas in Barcelona
Sants-Montjuïc
Gran Via de les Corts Catalanes
World's fair architecture in Barcelona
1929 Barcelona International Exposition
World's fair sites in Barcelona